The Scientific Sherlock Holmes: Cracking the Case with Science and Forensics is a book written by James O'Brien, which was originally published on 3 December 2012 and then by Oxford University Press, USA on 3 January 2013.

The book later went on to win the Edgar Award for Best Critical / Biographical Work in 2013.

External links 
 The Scientific Sherlock Holmes - book review on The Guardian
 Review: James O'Brien, The Scientific Sherlock Holmes: Cracking the Case with Science and Forensics
 As listed on Publishers Weekly
 As cited over Cambridge University Press

References 

Edgar Award-winning works
Non-fiction crime books
2013 non-fiction books
Oxford University Press books